Miss Mundo Colombia or Miss World Colombia is a national Beauty pageant that selects Colombia's representative to the Miss World pageant.  On occasion, when the winner does not qualify (due to age) for either contest, a runner-up is sent. The current Miss World Colombia is Camila Pinzón from Boyacá.

Titleholders
Color Key

See also
Miss World
Miss Colombia
Miss Universe Colombia
Miss Earth Colombia
Miss Grand Colombia

References

External links
Official website

Colombia
Recurring events established in 1990
Colombian awards